WWCH is an American radio station, licensed to Clarion, Pennsylvania, the seat of government for Clarion County.  WWCH is licensed to operate at the federally assigned frequency of 1300 kHz at a maximum power output of 850 watts.  WWCH is a full-service, live and local radio station with a country music format.

History
WWCH is the sole AM radio station in Clarion County, first going on the air with a maximum power output of 500 watts on June 12, 1960.  For much of this station's history, it had been a daytime-only operation, not getting nighttime power until the 1990s.

WWCH bears the distinction of maintaining its same ownership since its debut, with the only exception being the changing in the owner principals over the years.  William Sheridan was company president at the time of startup.  36 percent of the station was controlled by Mrs. Harriet Hearst, who also owned controlling stock in Clarion Newspapers, Inc., publisher of the weekly papers "The Clarion Democrat" and "The Clarion Republican".  Mrs. Hearst's family still manages WWCH to this day.

WWCH was joined by an FM sister station, also licensed to Clarion, in 1985.  That station is known as WCCR-FM.

WWCH has a long history of tenured personnel. Legendary News Director Frank Stacy has been a part of WWCH for more than twenty years.

On November 7, 2022, Seven Mountains Media announced their purchase of WWCH and sister station WCCR-FM from Clarion County Broadcasting. Seven Mountains Media also owns WKFT 101.3 FM in Strattanville, serving as a Clarion-area simulcast of WIFT 102.1 FM in DuBois.

References

1961-62 Broadcasting Yearbook
 Broadcasting Yearbook - Broadcast Stations Identified With Newspaper Or Magazine Ownership page B-228

External links

WCH
Radio stations established in 1960